Taheitia is a genus of very small land snails that have an operculum and live near saltwater, maritime terrestrial gastropod mollusks in the family Truncatellidae.

Species 
Species within the genus Taheitia include:
 Taheitia alata
 Taheitia elongata (Poey in Pfeiffer, 1856)
 Taheitia filicosta (Gundlach in Poey, 1858)
 Taheitia lamellicosta
 Taheitia lirata (Poey, 1858)
 Taheitia mariannarum
 Taheitia parvula
 Taheitia wrighti (Pfeiffer, 1862)

References 

Truncatellidae
Taxonomy articles created by Polbot